Michele Didoni (born 7 March 1974 in Milan) is an Italian retired race walker, world champion of the 20 km race walk at Gothenburg 1995.

Biography
He won six times the national championships at senior level. and after his retire, he was the coach of Italian Olympic champion Alex Schwazer.

Achievements

National titles
Italian Athletics Championships
10 km walk: road: 1994, 1996, 1998, 2001
20 km walk: road: 1995
50 km walk: road: 1998

See also
 FIDAL Hall of Fame
 Italian all-time lists - 20 km walk

References

External links

 

1974 births
Living people
Italian male racewalkers
Athletes (track and field) at the 1996 Summer Olympics
Athletes (track and field) at the 2000 Summer Olympics
Olympic athletes of Italy
Athletes from Milan
World Athletics Championships medalists
World Athletics Championships athletes for Italy
Athletics competitors of Centro Sportivo Carabinieri
Mediterranean Games silver medalists for Italy
Mediterranean Games bronze medalists for Italy
Mediterranean Games medalists in athletics
Athletes (track and field) at the 1997 Mediterranean Games
Athletes (track and field) at the 2005 Mediterranean Games
World Athletics Championships winners
20th-century Italian people
21st-century Italian people